USS Protector (ARS-14) was a  commissioned by the U.S. Navy during World War II. Her task was to come to the aid of stricken vessels.

Protector (ARS-14) was laid down by Colberg Boat Works, Stockton, California, 30 April 1942, launched 27 April 1943 sponsored by Mrs. F. S. M. Harris, and commissioned 28 December 1943.

World War II service 

After training and conducting salvage operations off the U.S. West Coast, Protector sailed from Seattle, Washington, for Alaskan waters, arriving 25 June. Attached to the Alaskan Sea Frontier Protector performed salvage and diving operations at various Alaskan stations until April 1945. She then returned to California, whence she sailed for the Marshalls, arriving at Eniwetok Atoll 2 August.

Protector was engaged in salvage of a sunken aircraft off Parry Island until 15 September when she sailed for Yokosuka, arriving 26 September. She conducted salvage operations at Yokosuka until 11 November, then assisted , aground in the vicinity of Fort No.2, Tokyo Bay.

Post-war decommissioning 

On 24 February 1946 she arrived at San Francisco, California, where she decommissioned 15 May. She was struck from the List of Navy Vessels 8 October 1946, transferred to the Maritime Commission; and sold 30 December 1946 to Mr. Glen R. Butt of Cambridge, Massachusetts. She was later resold, in 1952, to Pakistani interests. Her current fate is unknown.

References

External links 
 NavSource Online: Service Ship Photo Archive- ARS-14 Protector

 

Diver-class rescue and salvage ships
Ships built in Stockton, California
1943 ships
World War II auxiliary ships of the United States